Mambia  is a town and sub-prefecture in the Kindia Prefecture in the Kindia Region of western Guinea. It has an area of 808 km². As of 2014 its population is 26,500. 49% of the population is male while 51% is female.

Around 130 km west of the capital Conakry, the town Mambia is the chief-place of the sub-prefecture, and home to a major bauxite mining operation, the Compagnie Bauxite de Kindia (CBK).

References

Sub-prefectures of the Kindia Region